VPython is the Python programming language plus a 3D graphics module called Visual. VPython allows users to create objects such as spheres and cones in 3D space and displays these objects in a window. This makes it easy to create simple visualizations, allowing programmers to focus more on the computational aspect of their programs. The simplicity of VPython has made it a tool for the illustration of simple physics, especially in the educational environment.

History
In 1985, the cT programming language was created by researchers at Carnegie Mellon University. Contributors to the project included David Andersen, Bruce Sherwood, Judith Sherwood, and Kevin Whitley. The cT programming language was largely spawned from the TUTOR (1965) and the MicroTutor (1977) programming languages. Although cT had many applications, its primary usage was 2D graphics for the classroom setting. Many prize-winning educational programs were written in cT (see VISQ), especially in the area of physics. In 1997, students at Carnegie Mellon were taught cT in a new introductory physics course created by Ruth Chabay and Bruce Sherwood.

In 1998, David Scherer entered the university as a freshman and enrolled in one of the introductory physics classes that used cT. Although cT offered a relatively easy 2D graphics programming environment, Scherer saw the possibility of creating an even better tool. In the spring and summer of 2000, with the assistance of David Andersen, Ruth Chabay, Ari Heitner, Ian Peters, and Bruce Sherwood, Scherer created Visual, a module for Python that was not only easier to use than the cT programming language, but also rendered objects in three dimensions. The combination of Python plus Visual is called VPython. Further development of the cT programming language was ended and the newly created VPython was used in its place. Since VPython's creation, several versions have been released to the public.

In 2016, developers announced that classic VPython would no longer be developed. Instead, development will concentrate on Glowscript and Jupyter implementations of the language.

Usage
VPython is a simple rendering tool for 3D objects and graphs. Its main use has been in education, but it has also been used in commercial or research settings. VPython was first used in introductory physics courses at Carnegie Mellon and then spread to other universities and eventually high schools, especially in connection with the Matter & Interactions curriculum.

A related development due to David Scherer and Bruce Sherwood is GlowScript, which makes it possible to write and run VPython programs in a browser, including on mobile devices, thanks to the RapydScript Python-to-JavaScript compiler, created by Alexander Tsepkov. Programs can be written, run, and stored at glowscript.org, and the compiled-to-JavaScript code can be exported and embedded in one's own web page. John Coady has created the ivisual version for use in the IPython, now Jupyter environment, using the GlowScript WebGL graphics libraries to render 3D output in an IPython/Jupyter notebook. Rhett Allain in his Wired blog shows an example of using Trinkets to embed both editable VPython source code and 3D execution in one's own web page.

Objects
See the article on Python for Python syntax. This article will address several of the objects that are VPython specific. Click here for the complete documentation. The cylinder object is a good example of a simple VPython object. Here is an example of a simple cylinder as given in VPython's documentation (in older VPython implementations, the module to import is vpython, not visual):

from visual import *  # Import the visual module

rod = cylinder(pos=(0, 2, 1), axis=(5, 0, 0), radius=1)

Some similar objects offered by the VPython 3D rendering engine are the cone, sphere, and box objects. In addition to solid objects, VPython offers graphing tools as well. Here is an example of a simple graph in VPython as given in its documentation:  
from visual.graph import *  # Import graphing features
from numpy import arange, cos, exp

funct1 = gcurve(color=color.cyan)  # A connected curve object

for x in arange(0., 8.1, 0.1):  # x goes from 0 to 8
    funct1.plot(pos=(x, 5. * cos(2. * x) * exp(-0.2 * x)))  # Plot

References

External links 
http://www.vpython.org/
http://www.vpython.org/contents/cTsource/cToverview.html
http://linuxgazette.net/144/john.html

Articles with example Python (programming language) code
Python (programming language) libraries